Special Force 2: Tale of the Truthful Pledge is a computer game based on the 2006 Lebanon War between Hezbollah and Israel, produced by the Lebanese militant group Hezbollah. The game is a follow-up to Special Force, a game released by Hezbollah in 2003.

Special Force 2 is a first-person shooter (FPS) set in a 3D environment rendering the scenery and architecture of Southern Lebanon, in which the player takes the role of a Hezbollah fighter. Resource management plays a vital part in the game.

On August 16, 2007, it was announced that the game was ready for release. It is being sold for the equivalent of about US$10 and hundreds of copies were reportedly reserved before the launch.

Inspection of the game files reveals that it is a mod for Far Cry made into a standalone game.

Reception
Special Force 2: Tale of the Truthful Pledge was given positive reviews online by gaming critics who reside in Lebanon. Various online publications in America, however, thought the game would inspire Lebanese youth who were playing it to end up joining groups such as Hezbollah and gave it negative press as a result.

References

External links
  
 Special Force 2 Official Homepage 

2007 video games
Role-playing video games
Video game sequels
Video games with historical settings
Propaganda video games
Windows games
Windows-only games
Advergames
First-person shooters
Tactical shooter video games
Hezbollah
Video games developed in Lebanon